The 2014–15 Coppa Italia, also known as TIM Cup for sponsorship reasons, was the 68th edition of the national cup in Italian football. Napoli were the defending champions, having won the previous year's final, but were eliminated in the semi-finals by Lazio. Juventus emerged victorious with a 2–1 win in extra time, achieving a record tenth title.

Participating teams

Lega Calcio

Serie A (20 teams)

Atalanta
Cagliari
Cesena
Chievo
Empoli
Fiorentina
Genoa
Hellas Verona
Internazionale
Juventus
Lazio
Milan
Napoli
Palermo
Parma
Roma
Sampdoria
Sassuolo
Torino
Udinese

Serie B (22 teams)

Avellino
Bari
Bologna
Brescia
Carpi
Catania
Cittadella
Crotone
Frosinone
Latina
Livorno
Modena
Perugia
Pescara
Pro Vercelli
Spezia
Ternana
Trapani
Varese
Vicenza
Virtus Entella
Virtus Lanciano

Lega Pro (27 teams)

AlbinoLeffe
Alessandria
Bassano Virtus
Benevento
Casertana
Catanzaro
Como
Cosenza
Cremonese
FeralpiSalò
Juve Stabia
L'Aquila
Lecce
Messina
Monza
Novara
Pisa
Pontedera
Prato
Reggina
Renate
Salernitana
Santarcangelo
Savona
Südtirol
Teramo
Venezia

Serie D (9 teams)

Akragas
AltoVicentino
Correggese
Foligno
Matelica
Olginatese
RapalloBogliasco
Taranto
Terracina

Format and seeding
Teams enter the competition at various stages, as follows:
 First phase (one-legged fixtures)
 First round: 36 teams from Lega Pro and Serie D start the tournament
 Second round: the 18 winners from the previous round are joined by the 22 Serie B teams
 Third round: the 20 winners from the second round meet the 12 Serie A sides seeded 9-20
 Fourth round: the 16 survivors face each other
 Second phase
 Round of 16 (one-legged): the 8 fourth round winners are inserted into a bracket with the Serie A clubs seeded 1-8
 Quarter-finals (one-legged)
 Semi-finals (two-legged)
 Final (one-legged) at the Stadio Olimpico in Rome

First round
First round matches were played on 10 August 2014.

Second round
Second round matches were played on 16 & 17 August 2014.

Third round
Third round matches were played on 21, 22, 23 and 24 August 2014.

Fourth round
Fourth round matches were played on 2, 3 and 4 December 2014.

Final stage

Bracket

Round of 16
Round of 16 were played on 13, 14, 15, 20, 21 and 22 January 2015.

Quarter-finals
Quarter-finals were played on 27, 28 January, 3 and 4 February 2015.

Semi-finals
Semi-finals were played on 4–5 March & 7–8 April 2015.

First leg

Second leg

Final

Top goalscorers

References

Coppa Italia seasons
Italy
Coppa Italia